Andrea Rossi (born 5 March 1991) is a Swiss sport shooter.

He participated at the 2018 ISSF World Shooting Championships, winning a medal.

References

External links

Living people
1991 births
Swiss male sport shooters
ISSF rifle shooters